The International Emergency Economic Powers Act (IEEPA), Title II of , is a United States federal law authorizing the president to regulate international commerce after declaring a national emergency in response to any unusual and extraordinary threat to the United States which has its source in whole or substantial part outside the United States.  The act was signed by President Jimmy Carter on December 28, 1977.

Provisions

In the United States Code, the IEEPA is Title 50, §§1701–1707. The IEEPA authorizes the president to declare the existence of an "unusual and extraordinary threat... to the national security, foreign policy, or economy of the United States" that originates "in whole or substantial part outside the United States." It further authorizes the president, after such a declaration, to block transactions and freeze assets to deal with the threat. In the event of an actual attack on the United States, the president can also confiscate property connected with a country, group, or person that aided in the attack.

The IEEPA falls under the provisions of the National Emergencies Act (NEA), which means that an emergency declared under the act must be renewed annually to remain in effect.

The authority given to the President under the IEEPA does not grant them the ability to regulate or prohibit, directly or indirectly, any forms of personal communication (including means such as mail, telegraph or telephone), which “does not involve a transfer of anything of value;” imports or exports of information or any informational materials, “regardless of format or medium of transmission” (including but not limited to publications, films, posters, phonograph records, photographs, microforms, tapes, compact discs, CD-ROMs, artworks and news wire feeds, and interpreted to include modern mediums such as DVDs, digital media content and social media); certain donations “intended to be used to relieve human suffering” (such as food, clothing, and medicine); and any travel-related transactions (including importation of personal baggage, “maintenance within any country” including payment of living expenses and acquisition of goods or services intended for personal use, and arrangement or facilitation of such travel including non-scheduled air, sea, or land voyages).

History

Curtailment of emergency executive powers
Congress enacted the IEEPA in 1977 to clarify and restrict presidential power during times of declared national emergency under the Trading with the Enemy Act of 1917 ("TWEA"). Under TWEA, starting with Franklin D. Roosevelt in 1933, presidents had the power to declare emergencies without limiting their scope or duration, without citing the relevant statutes, and without congressional oversight. The Supreme Court in Youngstown Sheet & Tube Co. v. Sawyer limited what a president could do in such an emergency, but did not limit the emergency declaration power itself. A 1973 Senate investigation found (in Senate Report 93-549) that four declared emergencies remained in effect: the 1933 banking crisis with respect to the hoarding of gold, a 1950 emergency with respect to the Korean War, a 1970 emergency regarding the postal workers strike, and a 1971 emergency in response to the government's deteriorating economic and fiscal conditions. Congress terminated these emergencies with the National Emergencies Act, and then passed the IEEPA to restore the emergency power in a limited, overseeable form.

Unlike TWEA, IEEPA was drafted to permit presidential emergency declarations only in response to threats originating outside the United States.  Beginning with Jimmy Carter in response to the Iran Hostage Crisis, presidents have invoked IEEPA to safeguard U.S. national security interests by freezing or "blocking" assets of belligerent foreign governments, or certain foreign nationals abroad.

In 1988, Congress passed amendments to the TWEA and IEEPA, authored by Rep. Howard Berman (D–CA), aimed at protecting the rights of American citizens to receive information, regardless of the country of origin of such materials used, by exempting varied methods of communication from regulation. The revisions to both acts, known collectively as the “Berman Amendment,” restrict the President’s authority to regulate or prohibit the importation or exportation of various forms of print, audio and video materials, artwork and other images, and other informational materials protected under the First Amendment. The Office of Foreign Assets Control (OFAC) under the U.S. Department of Treasury, however, interpreted this exemption narrowly to claim it held the right to prohibit any transactions associated with “informational materials not fully created and in existence at the date of the transaction.” In response, the Berman-sponsored Free Trade in Ideas Act—passed by Congress in 1994—revised the original amendment's First Amendment exemptions to include newer and forthcoming mediums (including intangible items such as television broadcasts and methods of personal communication), further clarifying that the President’s emergency sanction powers under the IEEPA and TWEA cannot be used with regard to any information or informational materials, regardless of their format or medium, or whether they are intended for personal or commercial use. The updated language also clarified that the non-exhaustive list of exempted materials was illustrative in nature, inferring that unlisted materials not yet invented or in wide use at the time of its passage would be prohibited from being subject to sanctions or other regulation under both acts.

Since 9/11
Following the September 11, 2001 terrorist attacks, President George W. Bush issued Executive Order 13224 under the IEEPA to block the assets of terrorist organizations. The President delegated blocking authority to federal agencies led by the U.S. Treasury. In October 2001, Congress passed the USA PATRIOT Act which, in part, enhanced IEEPA asset blocking provisions under §1702(a)(1)(B) to permit the blocking of assets during the "pendency of an investigation." This statutory change gave the Treasury's Office of Foreign Assets Control the power to block assets without the need to provide evidence of the blocking subject's wrongdoing nor to permit the blocking subject a chance to effectively respond to the allegations in court. Executing these blocking actions led to a series of legal cases challenging federal authority to indefinitely prevent charitable organizations from accessing their assets held in the United States.

President Donald Trump used the IEEPA extensively, sanctioning more than 3,700 entities and invoking 11 national emergency declarations (out of the 13 that he declared overall) relying primarily or exclusively on IEEPA authority during his 2017–21 term; Trump also used or threatened use of its powers in unconventional and unprecedented manners (including executive actions utilizing powers under the act that prompted legal challenges).

On May 30, 2019, the White House announced that Trump would use IEEPA powers to introduce tariffs on Mexican exports in response to the national security threat of illegal immigration from Mexico into the United States. As part of an ongoing trade war with China, on August 24, 2019, Trump tweeted that he “hereby ordered” U.S. companies to start looking at alternatives to China on the basis of claimed powers under IEEPA. Trump, however, did not formally declare an emergency as required by IEEPA.

In September 2020, the Trump administration sanctioned and imposed visa restrictions on two International Criminal Court (ICC) officials, prosecutor Fatou Bensouda and Jurisdiction Complementarity and Cooperation Division Director Phakiso Mochochoko, over the court's investigation into allegations of war crimes committed by the U.S. and Israel in Afghanistan and the Palestinian territories, respectively. Critics considered the order an effort to intimidate ICC civil servants from proceeding with its investigation and accused the administration of targeting the two prosecutors, both of African origin, based on their race. The U.S. District Court for the Southern District of New York granted a preliminary injunction blocking the sanctions in January 2021, through a challenge to the order brought by four dual-national American law professors and the Open Society Justice Initiative. (The Biden administration lifted the ICC sanctions in April 2021.)

Also in September 2020, Trump used the IEEPA to order the removal of social media platforms TikTok and WeChat from U.S. app stores as well as prohibit domestic business transactions involving their respective China-based parent companies ByteDance and Tencent; the restrictions would have become applicable to TikTok unless it was sold to an American company within 45 days of the executive order’s issuance. Observers (including Trump administration critics and many TikTok users) raised First Amendment concerns with the executive order and suggested that, while national security concerns were cited to justify them, the sanctions were prompted by the administration’s hostile relations toward China in general and retaliation against TikTok in particular for certain anti-Trump content hosted by the app and, as also suggested by ByteDance in court documents pertaining to its lawsuit to overturn the order, a ticket reservation prank waged by some users of the video platform that depressed attendance for a campaign rally he held in Tulsa, Oklahoma that June. The executive order was blocked by federal courts in two separate cases on grounds that the sanctions likely violated IEEPA’s informational materials exemption (under the Berman Amendment) and First Amendment protections applying to users of the apps.

Litigation

Notable cases
 Dames & Moore v. Regan
 KindHearts for Charitable Humanitarian Development v. Geithner

Violations

In 1983, financier Marc Rich was accused of violating the act by trading in Iranian oil during the Iran hostage crisis. He was one of many people pardoned by President Bill Clinton in his last days in office.
On August 23, 2006, Javed Iqbal was arrested through the U.S. Department of the Treasury with a charge of conspiracy to violate the IEEPA for airing material produced by al-Manar (The Beacon) in New York City during the 2006 Israel-Lebanon conflict.
On December 16, 2009, it was announced that the U.S. Dept. of Justice reached a settlement with Credit Suisse over accusations that the bank assisted residents of IEEPA sanctioned countries to wire money in violation of the Act from 1995 to 2006. The settlement resulted in Credit Suisse forfeiting $536 million.
On July 16, 2020, a UAE-based firm, Essentra FZE Company Limited, admitted of conspiring to violate the International Emergency Economic Powers Act (IEEPA) and defying the United States sanctions on North Korea. The firm also agreed to pay a fine of $665,112 to the United States Department of Justice.

List of emergencies

Current
, the following IEEPA emergencies are active.

Past
Afghanistan (1999–2002 for harboring al-Qaeda)
Côte d'Ivoire (2006–2016 regarding the First Ivorian Civil War)
Haiti (1991–1994)
International Criminal Court (2020–2021 for investigating actions by United States personnel in Afghanistan)
Iraq (1990–2004 for invading Kuwait)
Kuwait (1990–1991, while occupied by Iraq)
Liberia (2001–2015 directed against President Charles G. Taylor)
Libya (1986–2004 for sponsoring terrorism)
Myanmar (1997–2016 against the policies of the military government)
Nicaragua (1985–1990 for aggressive activities in Central America)
Panama (1988–1990 against the Manuel Noriega government)
Russia (2000–2012 to support the Megatons to Megawatts Program)
Serbia and Montenegro (1992–2003 for sponsoring Serb nationalist groups)
Sierra Leone (2001–2004 for human rights violations)
South Africa (1985–1991 for maintaining apartheid)
UNITA (1993–2003 for interfering with UN peacekeeping efforts)

See also
 National Emergencies Act
 List of national emergencies in the United States

References

Further reading

External links
 International Emergency Economic Powers Act as amended (PDF/details) in the GPO Statute Compilations collection
 International Emergency Economic Powers Act as enacted (details) in the US Statutes at Large

1977 in law
95th United States Congress
United States federal trade legislation
Economic warfare
United States federal defense and national security legislation
United States foreign relations legislation